Mervyn Wingfield (1911–2005) was a Royal Navy officer

Mervyn Wingfield may also refer to:

 Mervyn Wingfield, 7th Viscount Powerscourt (1836–1904), Irish peer
 Mervyn Wingfield, 8th Viscount Powerscourt (1880–1947), Irish peer
 Mervyn Wingfield, 9th Viscount Powerscourt (1905–1973), Irish peer
 Mervyn Wingfield, 10th Viscount Powerscourt (1935–2015), Irish peer
 Mervyn Wingfield, 11th Viscount Powerscourt (born 1963), Irish peer

See also
 Mervyn Winfield (1933–2014), English cricketer